Begnagrad is the debut album of the band of the same name released in 1982 on the ZKP RTVL record label. The album later got reissued in 1992 by Ayaa Disques (with the album's alternative title, "Konzert for a Broken Dance") and in 2003 by Mio Records.

Critical reception

François Couture of AllMusic noted that "the group's highly original blend of Eastern European folk and complex progressive rock elements may not have been everyone's cup of tea, but the level of energy and the raw feelings conveyed by their first proper album make the music more immediate than one would expect".

Track listing
 Pjan Ska
 Romanticna
 Bo ze (Ce bo)
 Cosa Nostra (Waltz)
 Narodna/Kmetska
 Coc’n Rolla (Ljubljana ponoci)
 Zvizgovska Urska
 Jo Di Di Jo (Bonus track in the Ayaa and Mio Records reissues)
 Thelastnewone (Bonus track in the Ayaa and Mio Records reissues)
 Whistling Ursulla (Live 1983) (Bonus track in the Mio Records reissue)
 Thelastnewone (Live 1983) (Bonus track in the Mio Records reissue)

References 

Progressive rock albums by Slovenian artists
1982 debut albums